Hero Bank is a 2014 anime television series by TMS Entertainment, based on the video game of the same name by Sega. Set in a world where people participate in "Hero Battles" to earn money, an elementary school student named Kaito Gōshō ends up with a ten billion yen debt after renting out a powerful suit known as Enter the Gold. The series began airing on TV Tokyo from April 7, 2014, and is being simulcast by Crunchyroll. For episodes 27 to 51, the opening theme is "Kasege! Jarinko Hero" performed by Kakuda featuring Kamen Joshi, whilst the ending theme is "SARB" by High Speed Boyz.

Episode list

References

Hero Bank